Humbug Scrub is a locality north of Adelaide, South Australia in the local government areas of the Adelaide Hills Council and the City of Playford which contains the southern third of Para Wirra Conservation Park.

Demographics
The 2016 Census by the Australian Bureau of Statistics counted 416 persons at Humbug Scrub on census night. Of these, 215 (52.1%) were male and 198 (47.9%) were female.
The majority of residents 300 (73.2%) was born in Australia. 46 (11.2%) were born in England.
The median age of Humbug Scrub residents is 51. Children aged 0–14 years made up 12.1% of the population and people aged 65 years and over made up 21.9% of the population.

References

	

Suburbs of Adelaide